The water thick-knee (Burhinus vermiculatus), or water dikkop is a species of bird in the thick-knee family Burhinidae. The species is found across sub-Saharan Africa, usually close to water.

Distribution and habitat
The water thick-knee has a widespread distribution in sub-Saharan Africa, being found in Angola, Botswana, Burkina Faso, Burundi, Cameroon, Central African Republic, Republic of the Congo, Democratic Republic of the Congo, Eswatini, Ivory Coast, Ethiopia, Gabon, Ghana, Kenya, Liberia, Malawi, Mozambique, Namibia, Niger, Nigeria, Rwanda, Senegal, Somalia, South Africa, Tanzania, Uganda, Zambia, and Zimbabwe.

Across its range it is found on the edges of lakes, estuaries and rivers, as well as mangroves and also some sheltered beaches. It also needs bushes or nearby woodlands for shelter.

Description

It has a heavy bill that is black with yellow at the base. The wings are broad and blunt and the tail is short.

Behaviour
The water thick-knee is a terrestrial feeder that forages at night. It feeds on insects, crustaceans and mollusks.

The water thick-knee generally breeds in the dry season or early rainy season. It is a monogamous breeder with both parents guarding the nest and brooding the eggs. The nest is a simple scrape in sandy or stony ground, usually close to water. The clutch size is two sandy-yellow eggs. Both sexes incubate the eggs for 22-25 days, and both are responsible for feeding the young. Unique among birds, thick-knee pairs frequently nest adjacent to and sometimes directly on top of Nile crocodile nests. The two species share a form of symbiotic mutualism with the more energetic and vocal thick-knee functioning as loud sentries for the nests as the more powerful crocodile provides protection. Should a nest raider approach, the thick-knee pair will spread their wings in a threat display and harass and peck at the intruders to drive it off. If the pair not be successful, the mother crocodile will be drawn in by their continued calls and arrive.

References

External links
 Water dikkop/Water thick-knee - Species text in The Atlas of Southern African Birds.

water thick-knee
Birds of Sub-Saharan Africa
water thick-knee
Taxonomy articles created by Polbot
Taxa named by Jean Cabanis